Percy Stow (1876 – 10 July 1919) was a British director of short films. He was also the co-founder of Clarendon Film Company. He was born in Islington, London, England.
He was previously associated with Cecil Hepworth from 1901 to 1903, where he specialized in trick films.

Percy Stow was an early partner of Cecil Hepworth, regarded as one of the founders of the British film industry. The Clarendon Film Company was founded in 1904 by H.V. Lawley and Percy. The company was formed at Limes Road and its distinctive logo carried the abbreviation CFC.

Filmography 

Stow directed 293 short films including the first cinematic adaptation of Alice in Wonderland.

 1902 How to Stop a Motor Car
 1903 Alice in Wonderland
 1903 The Unclean World
 1904 The Mistletoe Bough
 1905 Willie and Tim in the Motor Car
 1906 Rescued in Mid-Air
 1907 The Pied Piper of Hamelin
 1908 A Wild Goose Chase
 1908 The Tempest
 1908 Robin Hood and His Merry Men
 1909 A Glass of Goat's Milk
 1909 The Invaders
 1910 Lieutenant Rose and the Foreign Spy
 1911 Lieutenant Rose and the Royal Visit
 1911 Lieutenant Rose and the Stolen Code
 1912 Lieutenant Rose and the Stolen Battleship
 1913 Love and the Varsity
 1913 Milling the Militants

Death
Stow died 10 July 1919 at the age of 43 years in Torquay, Devon, England.

References

External links

1876 births
1919 deaths
British film directors
Fantasy film directors
Articles containing video clips